A list of the native butterflies of Tokelau — a country of three tropical coral atolls, that is a dependent territory of New Zealand. It is located in the South Pacific Ocean.

Nymphalidae

Danainae
Euploea lewinii bourkei (Poulton, 1924)

Nymphalinae
Hypolimnas bolina pallescens (Butler, 1874)
Junonia villida villida (Fabricius, 1787)

See also

References
W.John Tennent: A checklist of the butterflies of Melanesia, Micronesia, Polynesia and some adjacent areas. Zootaxa 1178: 1-209 (21 Apr. 2006)

Fauna of Tokelau
Tokelau-related lists
Tokelau
Tokelau
Lists of biota of New Zealand
Tokelau
Tokelau
Tokelau
Tokelau